F21 or F-21 may refer to :

Aviation
 F 21 Luleå, a Swedish Air Force wing
 IAI F-21 Kfir, a 1973 Israeli-built all-weather, multi-role combat aircraft
 Lockheed Martin F-21, a variant of the F-16 designed for the Indian Air Force
 KAI KF-21 Boramae, a South Korean/Indonesian stealth fighter currently under development
 Farman F.21 Moustique II, a French interwar airplane
 Taylorcraft F-21, an American light aircraft

Nautical
 F21 (torpedo), a torpedo developed for the French Navy
 , a 1937 British Royal Navy Tribal-class destroyer
 , a Venezuelan navy frigate
 , an Indian Navy Godavari-class frigate
 , a Taiwanese navy destroyer

Land transport
 F-21 (Michigan county highway)
 BMW Series 1, that had a model code called "F21"

Other uses
 Schizotypal personality disorder, whose ICD-10 code is "F21"
 Fluorine-21 (F-21 or 21F), an isotope of fluorine

See also

 
 
 
 21 (disambiguation)